James William "Blue Dean" Everett (July 4, 1908 – May 3, 1996) was an American baseball pitcher in the Negro leagues. He played with the Lincoln Giants in 1929 and the Newark Eagles in 1936 and 1940.

References

External links
 and Seamheads

Newark Eagles players
Lincoln Giants players
1908 births
1996 deaths
Baseball players from Florida
People from Jacksonville, Florida
Baseball pitchers
20th-century African-American sportspeople